Campeche, Mexico, may refer to:

Campeche, one of the 32 component federal entities of the United Mexican States.
Campeche, Campeche, capital city of that state.